Nemorimyza posticata is a species of fly in the family Agromyzidae. It is found in the Palearctic.

Description : Interocular space matte black. Lunule soft black. Antennae and palps black. Mésonotum brilliant black. Acrostichal bristles sparse and in 7-8 rows. Legs brownish black all the knees yellow. Haltere knob whitish yellow. Female: abdomen black, les the two last segments clear brown. Male: The base of the abdomen more or less dark, the rest yellow.- Long. : 2,5–3 mm.

Life cycle : The larva mines Solidago, Aster, Baccharis, and Erechtites.

References

External links
Images representing  Nemorimyza posticata at BOLD

Agromyzidae
Insects described in 1830
Muscomorph flies of Europe